Kinghorn may refer to:

Places

 Kinghorn, a village in Fife, Scotland
 Kinghorn railway station in the Scottish village
Kinghorn, in Greenstone, Ontario
Kinghorn, in King, Ontario

Surnames

 Bill Kinghorn (1912–1977), Scottish footballer
 Blair Kinghorn (born 1997), Scottish rugby union player
 Ernest Kinghorn (1907–2001), British Labour Party politician
 Fred Kinghorn (1883-1971), Australian rugby league footballer
 Harry Kinghorn (1886–1955), Scottish footballer
 James Roy Kinghorn (1891–1983), Australian naturalist
 Joseph Kinghorn (1766–1832), English particular Baptist
 Samantha Kinghorn (born 1996), Scottish wheelchair racer

Other

 Battle of Kinghorn, a battle which took place on 6 August 1332 in the Scottish village
 Scott of Kinghorn, shipbuilding company in the Scottish village which closed in 1909

See also
 Edgar Kinghorn Myles